Enemy at the Door is a British television drama series made by London Weekend Television for ITV. The series was shown between 1978 and 1980 and dealt with the German occupation of Guernsey, one of the Channel Islands, during the Second World War. The programme generated a certain amount of criticism in Guernsey, particularly for being obviously filmed on Jersey despite being ostensibly set on Guernsey. The series also marked the TV debut of Anthony Head as a member of the island resistance. The theme music was composed by Wilfred Josephs.

Plot 
The islanders were chiefly represented by the respected local doctor, Philip Martel (Bernard Horsfall), who struggled to maintain the peace while the Germans were led by Major Dieter Richter (Alfred Burke), a peacetime academic who was inclined to be lenient on the Guernsey populace but whose approach was challenged by his more conventionally nasty SS counterpart Hauptsturmführer Klaus Reinicke (Simon Cadell). Rounding out the principal German characters were Major Freidel and Oberleutnant Kluge, a former policeman still more inclined to act as a policeman rather than a soldier.

Many episodes portrayed the balance of power and fragile harmony between the islanders and the German occupying forces, and how it was threatened by either resistance action or over-zealous clamping down by the Germans.

A precursor to his role as Bergerac in the detective series set on Jersey, John Nettles played a police detective ordered to work for the Germans and anguished by the conflict between his duty and collaborating with the enemy.

The series' narrative ended in 1943 with the Germans still occupying the island.

Cast

 Alfred Burke as Major Richter
 Bernard Horsfall as Dr. Philip Martel
 Simon Cadell as Hauptsturmfuhrer Reinicke
 John Malcolm as Oberleutnant Kluge
 Simon Lack as Major Freidel
 David Waller as Major General Müller
 Richard Heffer as Peter Porteous
 Helen Shingler as Helen Porteous
 Antonia Pemberton as Olive Martel
 Emily Richard as Clare Martel

Reception
The review on the Screenonline website by Sergio Angelini describes Enemy at the Door as featuring "stories and characters that explore the complex issues of alienation and wartime collaboration in a multi-faceted and surprisingly subtle fashion." However, "[W]hile striving for a sense of day-to-day reality, the series was shown well before the 9 o'clock watershed, consequently holding back from showing too much of the grim reality of the situation."

The series was re-broadcast in the UK by Talking Pictures TV from September 2020.

Episode list

Series Overview

Series 1: 21 January 1978 to 15 April 1978 (13 Episodes)
Series 2: 5 January 1980 to 29 March 1980 (13 Episodes)

Series 1 (1978)

Series 2 (1980)

References

External links
Episode guide, DVD review, cast gallery

ITV television dramas
World War II television drama series
1978 British television series debuts
1980 British television series endings
1970s British drama television series
1980s British drama television series
Television series based on actual events
Television series by ITV Studios
London Weekend Television shows
English-language television shows